
The Essex County Natural History Society (1833–1848) in Salem, Massachusetts, was formed "for the purpose of promoting the science of natural history." It endeavored "to form a complete collection of natural productions, curiosities. &c, particularly of this county; and, to form a library of standard books on the natural sciences." The society incorporated in 1836; Andrew Nichols, William Oakes, and William Prescott served as signatories. Other members included Samuel B. Buttrick, Samuel P. Fowler, John M. Ives, John C. Lee, George Osgood, Charles G. Page, Gardner B. Perry, George Dean Phippen, William P. Richardson, John Lewis Russell, Henry Wheatland. By 1836 some 100 members belonged to the society. In Salem its "cabinets and library were first deposited in Essex Place, then in Franklin Building, then in Chase's Building, Washington Street, and finally removed to Pickman Place, in 1842." In 1848 the society merged with the Essex Historical Society to form the Essex Institute.

See also
 Essex Institute (1848–1992), successor to the Natural History Society

References

Further reading
 Journal of the Essex County Natural History Society. 1836-ca.1852
 Samuel P. Fowler. An historical sketch. Bulletin of the Essex Institute, v.16, 1884.

External links
 Phillips Library, Peabody Essex Museum. Essex County Natural History Society Records, 1833-1873.

1833 establishments in Massachusetts
1848 disestablishments in the United States
History of Salem, Massachusetts
Natural history museums in Massachusetts
Libraries in Essex County, Massachusetts
Essex County, Massachusetts
Natural history societies